Jemaine Atea Mahana Clement (born 10 January 1974) is a New Zealand actor, comedian, musician, and filmmaker. He has released several albums with Bret McKenzie as the musical comedy duo Flight of the Conchords, and created a comedy series of the same name for both the BBC and HBO, for which he received six Primetime Emmy nominations.

He has had featured parts in films such as Eagle vs Shark (2007), Men in Black 3 (2012), People Places Things (2015), Humor Me (2017), The Festival (2018) and Avatar: The Way of Water (2022). He has also done voice-work for Despicable Me (2010), Rio (2011), Rio 2 (2014), Moana (2016) and The Lego Batman Movie (2017). In 2014, he made his directorial debut with What We Do in the Shadows, which he also co-wrote, co-directed and co-starred in with Taika Waititi, and later adapted into a show for FX Television series of the same name.

Early life
Clement was born on 10 January 1974 in Masterton in the Wairarapa, and was raised there in a working-class family by his mother and grandmother Maikara with his two brothers. Clement is Ngāti Kahungunu through his mother, and a direct descendant of the Maori chief Iraia Te Ama-o-te-rangi Te Whaiti, who is his great-great-great grandfather. His New Zealander father, Robert, was employed at the freezing works and struggled  with alcoholism, leaving home when Clement was a child. Robert would later become a stained glass artist in Midhurst, Taranaki; Jemaine would later reconnect with his father as an adult and now enjoys a "strong and loving" relationship with him.

Clement’s mother and grandmother were strong influences on him as a child, inspiring his sense of humour. Despite having a strong connection to his Maori ethnicity through visiting relatives regularly on trips to various marae, bans on the Māori language being spoken in schools meant Clement grew up in an almost entirely English-speaking environment. He has talked of his regrets about this and has emotionally spoken of the physical abuse his grandmother suffered at school for speaking Maori.

He attended Makoura College in Masterton. After finishing school he moved to Wellington, where he studied drama and film at Victoria University of Wellington. There he met Taika Waititi, with whom he went on to form So You're a Man and the Humourbeasts. In 2004, the Humourbeasts toured New Zealand in a stage show titled The Untold Tales of Maui, a reworking of the traditional Maori legends of Māui. The duo received New Zealand's highest comedy honour, the Billy T Award. During his time in university, he also met Bret McKenzie, with whom he performed in Edinburgh, thus forming Flight of the Conchords.

Career

Music

Clement and McKenzie have toured internationally and released four CDs: Folk the World Tour in 2002, The Distant Future EP in 2007 (winner of 2008 Grammy for Best Comedy  Album),  Flight of the Conchords in 2008 and I Told You I Was Freaky in 2009. In 2005 the Conchords produced Flight of the Conchords, a six-part comedy radio programme on BBC Radio 2. They appeared on Late Night with Conan O'Brien, the Late Show with David Letterman and The Late Late Show. After appearing in 2005 on HBO's One Night Stand, the Conchords were offered their own 12-part HBO series, Flight of the Conchords, which was based on their earlier BBC radio series of the same name. Its first season ran from June to September 2007, and was renewed for a second season, which aired on HBO in the US from January to March 2009.  In December 2009, the Conchords announced the show would not have a third season.

Film and television
Clement has appeared in several feature films. His debut was in the kung fu comedy Tongan Ninja, directed by New Zealander Jason Stutter. He has worked with Stutter on two more movies to date: the low budget ghost comedy Diagnosis: Death and the drama Predicament, based on the book by late New Zealand novelist Ronald Hugh Morrieson. Clement also has a role in American comedy Gentlemen Broncos, directed by Napoleon Dynamites Jared Hess. This role landed him a nomination for the Independent Spirit Award for Best Supporting Male. Though Gentlemen Broncos was almost universally panned by critics, some singled out Clement's performance for praise. In 2010, he voiced Jerry in Despicable Me and appeared in the film Dinner for Schmucks. In 2011, he voiced Nigel in Rio, and in 2012 he appeared as the primary antagonist Boris the Animal in Men in Black 3. In 2012, Jemaine co-wrote, co-directed, and starred in a vampire mockumentary titled What We Do in the Shadows with Taika Waititi. It premiered at the Sundance Film Festival on 19 January 2014. He also reprised his role as Nigel in Rio 2.

Clement has starred in television commercials internationally and provided voiceovers for many others in New Zealand.  On 5 February 2006, Outback Steakhouse began running a series of television commercials starring Clement during Super Bowl XL in which Clement pretends to be Australian and feigns an Australian accent. One of the long-running gags of Flight of the Conchords is the traditional rivalry between New Zealand and Australia and the differences between their accents. The campaign ended in July 2006.

Clement has been involved in award-winning radio work. In 1999, Clement was a Radio Awards Winner as writer for Trashed, for Channel Z, Wellington. In 2000, he was given a Special Radio Awards Commendation for The Sunglass Store.

Besides his television work on Flight of the Conchords, Clement was a writer and cast member of the television shows Skitz and Tellylaughs in New Zealand. Clement, with fellow Conchord member Bret McKenzie, guest starred as a pair of camp counselors in "Elementary School Musical", the season premiere of the 22nd season of The Simpsons, which aired on 26 September 2010.

Clement also played the role of a prisoner in a Russian gulag in the 2014 film Muppets Most Wanted, a sequel to The Muppets (2011).

Clement was featured as one of 2008's "100 Sexiest People" in a special edition of the Australian magazine Who.  Fellow Conchord member McKenzie appeared on the same list.

In 2015, Clement voiced a "mind-reading fart" on an episode of the Adult Swim animated series Rick and Morty, where he performed the song "Goodbye Moonmen". Clement also starred in the independent film, People Places Things, which received positive reviews.

In 2016, Clement lent his voice to Tamatoa, a giant coconut crab, in the Disney animated film Moana, both in English, and the Māori dub. He based the character's voice on that of David Bowie. 
  
In 2017, Clement played Oliver Bird in the FX TV series Legion. He also voiced Sauron in The Lego Batman Movie.

Personal life
Clement's family did not have a car when he was a boy, and as a result he has never learnt to drive. In August 2008, Clement married his longtime girlfriend, theatre actress and playwright Miranda Manasiadis. Their son, Sophocles Iraia, was born in October 2008 in New York City and is named after Manasiadis's Greek great-grandfather Sophocles, and Clement's great-great-great grandfather Iraia Te Ama-o-te-rangi Te Whaiti. They live in Wellington.

Filmography

Film

Television

Discography

Radio

Awards and nominations

Notes

References

External links 

 
 NZ on screen profile
 BBC Radio 2

1974 births
Living people
20th-century New Zealand male actors
21st-century New Zealand male actors
Flight of the Conchords members
Grammy Award winners
New Zealand Māori musicians
New Zealand male comedians
New Zealand male film actors
New Zealand male Māori actors
New Zealand male television actors
New Zealand male voice actors
New Zealand musicians
Ngāti Kahungunu people
People from Masterton
New Zealand film directors
New Zealand film producers
New Zealand screenwriters
New Zealand expatriates in the United Kingdom
New Zealand expatriates in the United States